Līga Dekmeijere and Alicja Rosolska won the final 7–5, 6–3 against Mariya Koryttseva and Julia Schruff.

Seeds

Draw

Draw

External links
 Draw

Cachantun Cup